Rescue Engineering (RE) is an interdisciplinary bachelor's- and master's degree at the Technical University of Cologne since 2002 and at the Hamburg University of Applied Sciences (bachelor only) since 2006, this academic degree prepares for working at fire brigades, emergency medical servicees or other aid organisations.

University
Rescue Engineering has existed since 2002, the preconditions being the allgemeinen Fachhochschulreife a work experience of four month. 
Rescue Engineering is a full-time study with lectures and interns. Support and many assistant professors come from the Institut für Notfallmedizin and the professional fire brigades.

Curriculum
The curriculum is similar to industrial engineering, fielded in parts of engineering, economics and social science.

The basics cover the subjects of chemistry, physics, mathematics, mechanics, materials science, electrical and measurement engineering.

The economics part consists of business and administration, accounting, taxes, logistics, quality management and project management

In the field of the socioscientifics subjects like law and mediation but also public health, psychology, sociology and epidemiology should create comprehension for special task in the work of rescue.

Career
The alumnus can be employed at professional fire brigades, GO or in the management of emergency medical services. Tasks in fire prevention in industry or commerce can also be a career destination.

References
Yvonne Globert: Strategien entwickeln und Harte Kerle. In: Frankfurter Rundschau PLUS Wissen & Bildung. Nummer 26/01. Februar 2005, Seite 28.
Hans-Martin Barthold : Klare Köpfe für das Chaos. In: Frankfurter Allgemeine Zeitung. 21. Juni 2003. Seite 53.

External links
Kölner Rettungsingenieure
Hamburger Forum
Information der FH Köln
Information der HAW
rundschau-online.de - Rettung als Hochschulfach, 22. März 2005
taz.de - Akademie der Helden, 25. January 2005 
zeit.de - Der neue Studiengang Rescue Engineering, July 2001

Rescue
Education in Germany